The Großer Prebelowsee is a lake in the Rheinsberg Lake Region, Brandenburg, Germany. It is in Prebelow, a village in borough of Rheinsberg.

See also
Großer Zechliner See
Schwarzer See
Tietzowsee
Zootzensee

Lakes of Brandenburg
Ostprignitz-Ruppin
Federal waterways in Germany
LGrosserPrebelowsee